Simone Bolelli was the champion in 2010, but chose not to defend his title.

2nd seed Carlos Berlocq defeated 4th seed Albert Ramos 6–4, 6–3 in the final and claimed the title.

Seeds

Draw

Finals

Top half

Bottom half

References
 Main Draw
 Qualifying Draw

Sporting Challenger - Singles
Sporting Challenger